The Ignyte Awards are an annual literary award for the best science fiction, fantasy, and horror works and achievements of the previous year. Established in 2020 by writers L. D. Lewis and Suzan Palumbo as an off-shoot of FIYAH Literary Magazine, the awards aim to celebrate diversity and inclusion in the speculative fiction genre, and are presented in 15 categories spanning fiction, non-fiction and community service. Trophies are awarded to winners at FIYAHCON, an annual speculative fiction convention focused on black, indigenous and people-of-color perspectives in the genre.

The Ignyte Awards are part-juried and part-public vote: finalists are selected by the convention committee, and winners are then determined in an online ballot. The 2021 finalists were announced in April, and winners were announced at a virtual edition of the convention in September.

Winners

Best Novel – Adult

Best Novel – YA

Best in Middle Grade

Best Novella

Best Novelette

Best Short Story

Best in Speculative Poetry

Critics Award

Best Fiction Podcast

Best Artist

Best Comics Team

Best Anthology/Collected Works

Best in Creative Nonfiction

The Ember Award

The Community Award

References

Awards established in 2020
Fantasy awards
Horror fiction awards
Science fiction awards
Anthology awards
Comics awards
Novella awards
Poetry awards
Podcasting awards
Short story awards
Short story collection awards